Mehdi Chaman ara football player who played for Foolad F.C..

Club career
Chaman ara joined Foolad in 2009 after spending the previous two seasons at Malavan F.C.

Club career statistics

 Assist Goals

References

1987 births
Living people
Iranian footballers
Foolad FC players
Malavan players
Association football midfielders